The 1978 European Formula Two season was contested over 12 rounds. Italian driver Bruno Giacomelli, driving the works March car, won the season in dominant fashion.

Calendar

Note:

Race 2, 8 and 12 were held in two heats, with results shown in aggregate.

Final point standings

Drivers

For every race points were awarded: 9 points to the winner, 6 for runner-up, 4 for third place, 3 for fourth place, 2 for fifth place and 1 for sixth place. No additional points were awarded.

Three scores were dropped. Dropped scores are shown in parentheses.

Note:

Only drivers who were not graded were able to score points.

References

Formula Two
European Formula Two Championship seasons